Toc H (also TH) is an international Christian movement. The name is an abbreviation for Talbot House, "Toc" signifying the letter T in the signals spelling alphabet used by the British Army in World War I. A soldiers' rest and recreation centre named Talbot House was founded in December 1915 at Poperinghe, Belgium. It aimed to promote Christianity and was named in memory of Gilbert Talbot, son of Lavinia Talbot and Edward Talbot, then Bishop of Winchester, who had been killed at Hooge in July 1915. The founders were Gilbert's elder brother Neville Talbot, then a senior army chaplain, and the Reverend Philip Thomas Byard (Tubby) Clayton. Talbot House was styled as an "Every Man's Club", where all soldiers were welcome, regardless of rank. It was "an alternative for the 'debauched' recreational life of the town".

In 1920, Clayton founded a Christian youth centre in London, also called Toc H, which developed into an interdenominational association for Christian social service. The original building at Poperinghe has been maintained and redeveloped as a museum and tourist venue. Branches of Toc H were established in many countries around the world. An Australian branch was formed in Victoria in 1925 by the heretical Rev. Herbert Hayes. Another was formed in Adelaide the same year.

Toc H members seek to ease the burdens of others through acts of service. They also promote reconciliation and work to bring disparate sections of society together. Branches may organise localised activities such as hospital visits, entertainment for the residents of care homes and organising residential holidays for special groups.

The organisation suffered a progressive decline in membership and closure of branches during the later 20th century. In 2008, continued operation was ensured by dispensing with paid staff. In the 21st century, Toc H trustees have planned for it to become a stronger, voluntary movement still guided by the ethos of the original Talbot House.

Schools
Toc H runs schools in India such as Toc-H Public School.
 
In 2004 it was reported that Toc H had decided to invest in an academy school in Bradford, England.
The then chief executive, Geoff Smith, said that the academy would reflect the charity's commitment to community building. It was opened in 2008 by John Sentamu, the Archbishop of York.

History

Foundation in World War I

At the outbreak of World War I Neville Talbot, a senior Church of England chaplain in the British Army, sought to recruit chaplains who would minister to the battalions on the front lines. One of his recruits was the Reverend Phillip Byard Clayton, who was assigned to the East Kent and Bedfordshire regiments. In 1915 Clayton was sent to France and then on to the town of Poperinge in Belgium.

Sitting a few miles back from the trenches around Ypres (nowadays known by its Flemish name Ieper), Poperinge (or "Pops", as the soldiers called it) was a busy transfer station where troops on their way to and from the battlefields of Flanders were billeted. Clayton, universally known as "Tubby", was instructed by Neville Talbot to set up some sort of rest house for the troops.

Clayton chose the Coevoet house – temporarily vacated by its owner, a wealthy local hop merchant – to use as his base, paying rent of 150 francs a month. The house had received significant damage from shellfire, especially the hop loft and the garden. Repairs were begun in September by the Royal Engineers. It opened on 11 December 1915.

Clayton decided to steer away from the traditional church club and set up an Everyman’s House. It was named Talbot House in honour of Lieutenant Gilbert Talbot (Neville’s brother) who had been killed earlier in the year. Talbot House soon became known by its initials TH, and then, in the radio signalers’ phonetic alphabet of the day as Toc Aitch. 

The focus of religious services and devotions was a chapel created in the attic, known as the "Upper Room". After the war's end, in 1918, the interior of the Chapel was sent to London, and temporarily displayed in the crypt of All Hallows-by-the-Tower. From the concise guidebook Clayton compiled for its visitors, we learn why precisely these objects had to be taken home, and why they would return to Poperinge in 1929.

Spirit
The spirit of friendship fostered at Toc H across social and denominational boundaries inspired Clayton, the Rev. Dick Sheppard and Alexander Paterson to set out in 1920 what became known as the Four points of the Toc H compass:

 Friendship ("To love widely")
 Service ("To build bravely")
 Fairmindedness ("To think fairly")
 The Kingdom of God ("To witness humbly")

This followed the foundation of a new Toc H House in Kensington in 1919, followed by others in London, Manchester, and Southampton. The Toc H movement continued to grow in numbers and established, also, a women's league. In 1930, Clayton led Toc H into creative support of the British Empire Leprosy Relief Association.

See also
 Toc-H Institute of Science and Technology
 Toc-H Public School
 "Pow R. Toc H." (Pink Floyd song)

References

Further reading
 Clayton, P. B. (1919). Tales of Talbot House 1915–1918. London: Chatto & Windus
 Baron, Barclay (1946). The Birth of a Movement 1919–1922. London: Toc H
 Rice, Judith, and Prideaux-Brune, Ken (1990). Out of A Hop Loft: Seventy Five Years of Toc H. London: Darton, Longman and Todd. 
 MacFie, A. B. S. (1956). The Curious History of Toc H Women's Association. London. Toc H Women's Association.
 MacFie, A. B. S. (1960). The Further History of Toc H Women's Association. London. Toc H Women's Association.
 Toc H Royal Charter and Byelaws. 10 June 1971 (as amended 16 July 2002).

External links

 The Story of Talbot House (TOC H) at The GreatWar 1914–1918 (greatwar.co.uk)
 Toc H UK
 All Hallows By The Tower, Guild Church of Toc H

1915 establishments in the United Kingdom
Christian charities based in the United Kingdom
International charities
Organizations established in 1915
Social welfare charities based in the United Kingdom